Neave Township is one of the twenty townships of Darke County, Ohio, United States. The 2010 census found 2,330 people in the township, 1,612 of whom lived in the unincorporated portions of the township.

Geography
Located in the southern part of the county, it borders the following townships:
Greenville Township - north
Van Buren Township - east
Twin Township - southeast corner
Butler Township - south
Harrison Township - southwest corner
Liberty Township - west

The village of Wayne Lakes is located in southern Neave Township.

Name and history
It is the only Neave Township statewide.

Neave Township was established in 1821.

Government
The township is governed by a three-member board of trustees, who are elected in November of odd-numbered years to a four-year term beginning on the following January 1. Two are elected in the year after the presidential election and one is elected in the year before it. There is also an elected township fiscal officer, who serves a four-year term beginning on April 1 of the year after the election, which is held in November of the year before the presidential election. Vacancies in the fiscal officer  or on the board of trustees are filled by the remaining trustees.  The current trustees are Keith Godown, Ty House, and Walter Wiant, and the fiscal officer is Diane Delaplane.

References

External links
County website

Townships in Darke County, Ohio
Townships in Ohio